Tion Webster (born 21 April 1995) is a Trinidad and Tobago cricketer. He made his first-class debut for Trinidad and Tobago in the 2016–17 Regional Four Day Competition on 7 April 2017. He made his Twenty20 debut for Barbados Tridents in the 2017 Caribbean Premier League on 20 August 2017.

In November 2017, he scored his maiden century in first-class cricket, making 178 for against Trinidad and Tobago against Jamaica in the 2017–18 Regional Four Day Competition. He made his List A debut for Trinidad and Tobago in the 2017–18 Regional Super50 on 30 January 2018.

On 3 June 2018, he was selected to play for the Winnipeg Hawks in the players' draft for the inaugural edition of the Global T20 Canada tournament. In November 2019, he was named in Trinidad and Tobago's squad for the 2019–20 Regional Super50 tournament. In July 2020, he was named in the Trinbago Knight Riders squad for the 2020 Caribbean Premier League.

References

External links
 

1995 births
Living people
Barbados Royals cricketers
Trinidad and Tobago cricketers
Place of birth missing (living people)